Paul Curkeet Samson (June 12, 1905 – February 10, 1982) was an American competition swimmer who represented the United States at the 1928 Summer Olympics in Amsterdam, Netherlands.  Samson swam for the first-place U.S. team in the qualifying heats of the men's 4×200-meter freestyle relay.  Because he did not swim in the relay event final he was not eligible to receive a medal under the 1928 Olympic rules.  He was also a member of the fourth-place U.S. water polo team.

Samson was born in Emporia, Kansas.  He enrolled in the University of Michigan and swam for the Michigan Wolverines swimming and diving team in National Collegiate Athletic Association (NCAA) competition.  In 1927, he won the NCAA national championships in the 220-yard freestyle (2:26.6) and the 440-yard freestyle (5:28.7).

See also
 List of University of Michigan alumni
 List of University of Michigan sporting alumni
 World record progression 4 × 200 metres freestyle relay

References

External links
  Paul Samson – Olympic athlete profile at Sports-Reference.com

1905 births
1982 deaths
American male freestyle swimmers
American male water polo players
Michigan Wolverines men's swimmers
Olympic swimmers of the United States
Olympic water polo players of the United States
People from Emporia, Kansas
Swimmers at the 1928 Summer Olympics
Water polo players at the 1928 Summer Olympics